Çlirim Kryeziu  (born 15 February 1989) is a Swiss of Albanian ethnicity retired footballer.

External links

1989 births
Living people
Association football midfielders
Swiss men's footballers
Albanian footballers
FC Kreuzlingen players
APEP FC players
Cypriot First Division players
Swiss expatriate footballers
Expatriate footballers in Cyprus
Swiss expatriate sportspeople in Cyprus